Hohenlohe-Langenburg was a German county and later principality in the Holy Roman Empire. It was located in the current northeastern Baden-Württemberg, Germany, around Langenburg. Since the medieval times this small state was ruled by the House of Hohenlohe, counts and since 1764 ruling Princes of the Holy Roman Empire, until 1806. The princely House of Hohenlohe-Langenburg still owns and lives in Langenburg Castle today.

History 

In 1253 the town and castle of Langenburg were inherited by the lords of Hohenlohe, after the lords of Langenburg had become extinct. Despite repeated divisions in the 13th and 15th centuries and a donation to the Teutonic Order of 1219, the House of Hohenlohe was able to form an almost complete territory of which Langenburg was a part. The lordship of Hohenlohe was elevated to the status of a county in 1495. The house often divided its possessions so that different lines emerged and sometimes merged again later. 

In 1586-1590, the Neuenstein line split into the Langenburg side line under Count Friedrich. Of the protestant branch of Hohenlohe-Neuenstein, which underwent several partitions and inherited the county of Gleichen in Thuringia (with its residence in Ohrdruf) in 1631, the senior line became extinct in 1805, while in 1701 the junior line divided itself into three branches, those of Hohenlohe-Langenburg, Hohenlohe-Ingelfingen and Hohenlohe-Kirchberg. Hohenlohe-Langenburg was raised from a county to a principality in 1701, and was mediatised to Württemberg in 1806.

The House of Hohenlohe-Langenburg remained Protestant, and has remained closely related to Europe's Protestant ruling dynasties. Queen Adelaide of the United Kingdom was a Hohenlohe-Langenburg on her mother's side and her cousin, Prince Ernst, married in 1828 Feodora of Leiningen, the half-sister of the future Queen Victoria. In 1896, Feodora's grandson, another Prince Ernst, married Victoria's granddaughter, Princess Alexandra of Edinburgh and Saxe-Coburg-Gotha. Prince Gottfried (1897–1960) was married in 1931 to his second cousin once removed, Princess Margarita of Greece and Denmark (1905–1981). She was the eldest daughter of Prince Andrew of Greece and Denmark and his wife Princess Alice of Battenberg, and sister of Prince Philip, Duke of Edinburgh. The British royal family therefore still occasionally visit Langenburg and, conversely, the Hohenlohe-Langenburgs are regular guests at the British court.

Prince Karl Gustav Wilhelm (1777–1866) of Hohenlohe-Langenburg, who came from a younger branch, founded a Catholic, Bohemian branch at Rothenhaus Castle (today Červený Hrádek Castle in Jirkov, Czech Republic) in the 19th century. As one of 16 mediatized princely houses of the former Holy Roman Empire, then residing in Austria-Hungary, this family had a hereditary seat in the House of Lords (Austria). Prince Max Egon (1897–1968) tried to prevent the occupation of Czechoslovakia by Hitler in 1938 through diplomatic negotiations with the British government. After World War II, Prince Max Egon was expropriated by the communist government. Due to the wealthy Spanish origins of his wife, his descendants still live mainly in Spain, among them Princess Victoria of Hohenlohe-Langenburg, 20th Duchess of Medinaceli.

Counts of Hohenlohe-Langenburg (1610–1764)

 Philipp Ernst, Count 1610–1628 (1584–1628); son of Wolfgang zu Hohenlohe (d. 1610)
 Ludwig Kraft, Count 1628–1632 (1613–1632)
 Joachim Albert, Count 1632–1650 (1619–1675); also Count of Hohenlohe-Kirchberg
  Henry Frederick, Count 1650–1699 (1625–1699)
 Christian Kraft, Count 1699–1701 (1668–1743); also Count of Hohenlohe-Ingelfingen
 Frederick Eberhard, Count 1699–1701 (1672–1737); also Count of Hohenlohe-Kirchberg
  Albert Wolfgang, Count 1701–1715 (1659–1715)
  Louis, Count 1715–1764 (1696–1765); raised to Prince Jan 7, 1764

Princes of Hohenlohe-Langenburg (1764–1806; titular to the present)

 Louis, 1st Prince 1764–1765 (1696–1765)
 Christian Albert, 2nd Prince 1765–1789 (1726–1789)
  Carl Ludwig I, 3rd Prince 1789–1825 (1762–1825)
  Ernst I, 4th Prince 1825–1860 (1794–1860)
 Carl Ludwig II, 5th Prince April 12–21, 1860 (1829–1907); renounced his rights
  Hermann, 6th Prince 1860–1913 (1832–1913)
  Ernst II, 7th Prince 1913–1950 (1863–1950)
  Gottfried, 8th Prince 1950–1960 (1897–1960)
 Crato, 9th Prince 1960–2004 (1935–2004)
  Philipp Gottfried Alexander, 10th Prince 2004–present (b. 1970)
 Max-Leopold
  Gustav
  Prince Albrecht (1944–1992)
  Prince Ludwig Ferdinand (b. 1976)
  Prince Friedrich Ernst (1750–1794)
  Prince Karl Gustav Wilhelm (1777–1866); founder of the catholic Bohemian branch 
  Prince Ludwig Karl Gustav (1823–1866) ∞ Gabriela of Trauttmansdorff-Weinsberg (1840–1923), heiress of Rothenhaus Castle
  Prince Gottfried Karl Joseph (1860–1933)
  Prince Max Egon (1897–1968), private diplomat in World War II
  Prince Alfonso (1924–2003)
  Prince Hubertus (b. 1959)

See also
Hohenlohe
Princess of Hohenlohe-Langenburg

References

External links
 European Heraldry page

Counties of the Holy Roman Empire
 
1610 establishments in Europe